The Andrea M. Bronfman Prize for the Arts  (the Andy,) is an annual design award given to  an Israeli decorative artist working in ceramics, glass, textiles or jewellery.

Awards

The prize includes a cash award of  NIS 50,000, in addition to a solo exhibit at the Tel Aviv Museum of Art and a published catalogue of the exhibit.  Also, two of the artist's works are purchased, one to be added to the permanent collection of the Israel Museum, and one to be added to the collection of the Tel Aviv Museum of Art.

In 2017 the prize was relaunched by Bronfman's children as The Andy, $5,000 prize awarded annually to each of three students at the Bezalel Academy of Arts and Design.

History
The prize was created by Charles Bronfman in 2006 to mark Andrea Bronfman's 60th birthday; she was hit by a car and died before the first award was made.

Winners
 2006: Hadas Rosenberg-Nir.
 2007: Itay Noy.
 2008: Esther Knobel.
 2010: Tzuri Gueta.

References

Design awards
Visual arts awards
Arts awards in Israel
Awards established in 2006